Georgia competed at the 2020 Winter Youth Olympics in Lausanne, Switzerland from 9 to 22 January 2020.

Medalists
Medals awarded to participants of mixed-NOC teams are represented in italics. These medals are not counted towards the individual NOC medal tally.

Alpine skiing

Boys

Girls

Figure skating

four Georgian figure skaters achieved quota places for Georgia based on the results of the 2019 World Junior Figure Skating Championships.

Singles

Couples

Mixed NOC team trophy

Luge

Boys

Ski jumping

Girls

See also
Georgia at the 2020 Summer Olympics

References

2020 in Georgian sport
Nations at the 2020 Winter Youth Olympics
Georgia (country) at the Youth Olympics